Kristopher John Faafoi (born 23 June 1976) is a former New Zealand Labour Party politician. He became the Member of Parliament for the Mana electorate in 2010. He did not contest the seat as an electorate MP in 2020 but continued as a list MP. He held a number of ministerial portfolios in the Sixth Labour Government from 2017, until he announced his retirement from politics in June 2022.

Early life
Faafoi's parents originate from the Tokelau atoll of Fakaofo. He grew up in Christchurch. His father was sent to New Zealand to study at secondary school, and later became a primary-school teacher. His mother came to New Zealand as part of a repatriation scheme, and later worked in a factory. Faafoi has stated that he did not have a typical Tokelau upbringing and does not speak fluent Tokelauan. In 1994 he was a member of the New Zealand Youth Parliament, selected to represent Sydenham MP Jim Anderton.

Professional career
Faafoi trained as a journalist and is a graduate of the New Zealand Broadcasting School at CPIT (now Ara Institute of Canterbury). He worked for the BBC and as a political commentator. Prior to the Mana by-election, he was the chief press secretary for Labour leader Phil Goff, and the Rongotai Pacific branch chair of the Labour Party.

Political career

Fifth National Government (2010–2017)
After the resignation of Mana MP Luamanuvao Winnie Laban on 10 August 2010, 
Faafoi was chosen to represent the Labour Party in the resulting by-election, which was set for 20 November. Four people contested the selection, with Faafoi defeating business manager Michael Evans, barrister Peter Foster and communications adviser Josie Pagani. During the campaign, he was criticised for a campaign brochure stating, "I had a great start because my family settled in Mana," implying that he grew up in the North Island electorate despite being raised in Christchurch in the South Island.

Faafoi won the by-election with 10,980 votes (46.4%), becoming the first MP of Tokelauan descent. Hekia Parata from the National Party was placed second and received 9,574 (41.6%), giving Faafoi a margin of 1,080 votes (4.82%). This was a significant decrease of Laban's majority of 6,155 (17.7%) at the 2008 general election. Faafoi more than doubled the margin in the  election, and had a 7,953 votes margin in the  election.

Sixth Labour Government (2017–present)

First term, 2017–2020
Kris Faafoi was elected as a Minister of Civil Defence, Commerce and Consumer Affairs and Associate Minister of Immigration, outside Cabinet by the Labour Party caucus following Labour's formation of a coalition government with New Zealand First and the Greens.

On 30 August 2017, Faafoi announced that the Government was investing NZ$5.2 million into supporting "rapid response teams" to support communities in emergencies. The boost in funding was the result of a critical Ministerial Technical Advisory Group's (TAG) review of the Government's unsatisfactory responses to the 2016 Kaikoura earthquake and the 2017 Port Hills fires.

When Minister of Customs Meka Whaitiri "stood aside" in August 2018 over a "staffing matter" pending an investigation that same day, Faafoi assumed the Customs portfolio.

On 7 September 2018 Faafoi was appointed Minister of Broadcasting, Communications and Digital Media upon the resignation of Clare Curran. In 2018 his main political priority was  "dealing with loan sharks".

On 27 June 2019, Faafoi was appointed Minister of Government Digital Services, complementing his role as Minister of Broadcasting, Communications and Digital Media. He also assumed the position of Associate Minister for Public Housing. Faafoi relinquished his position as Minister of Civil Defence and Minister of Customs, which were assumed by Peeni Henare and Jenny Salesa respectively.

On 6 December 2019, Faafoi apologised to Prime Minister Jacinda Ardern for promising to speed up an immigration visa application for Opshop singer Jason Kerrison's father. Opposition National Party leader Simon Bridges claimed that Faafoi's actions could constitute a conflict of interest that breached Cabinet rules.

On 8 February 2020 he announced his intention to not seek re-election in Mana for the 2020 election; he will stand as a List MP instead. On 22 July, Faafoi became Minister of Immigration after Iain Lees-Galloway was dismissed following his admission of an inappropriate relationship with a former staffer in one of his agencies.

On 4 September, Faafoi, in his capacity as Immigration Minister, extended the visas of visitors due to expire before the end of October by five months. In addition, temporary migrants unable to leave New Zealand due to international travel restrictions caused by the COVID-19 pandemic will be granted a new two-month COVID-19 short-term visa.

Second term, 2020–present
During the 2020 general election, Faafoi was re-elected on the party list. In early November 2020, Faafoi was appointed as Minister of Justice, while retaining his "Broadcasting and Media" and Immigration portfolios.

On 21 December 2020, Faafoi, in his capacity as Immigration Minister, announced a six-month extension for employer-assisted work and working holiday visa holders along with their partners and children in order to address the country's labour shortage. In addition, a 12-month stand-down period for low-paid Essential Skills visa holders working in New Zealand for three years was suspended until January 2022.

In July 2021, Justice Minister Faafoi introduced the Conversion Practices Prohibition Legislation Bill , which seeks to ban conversion therapy. The Bill passed its third reading on 15 February 2022.

In mid–November 2021, Faafoi introduced legislation to repeal the Sentencing and Parole Reform Act 2010 (the so-called "Three Strikes Law"). He described the "three-strikes law" as  "archaic, unfair, and ineffective" and claimed it had led to "absurd and perverse" outcomes. While the proposed repeal legislation was supported by the Labour and Green parties, the opposition National and ACT parties opposed repealing the "three strikes law."

On 13 June 2022, it was announced that Faafoi would resign his seat in Parliament soon in order to spend more time with his family, particularly his school-aged youngest son. Faafoi had wanted to resign during the 2020 general election but Ardern had convinced him to stay for another year. His resignation triggered a cabinet reshuffle within the Sixth Labour Government, in which Faafoi's immigration, justice and broadcasting portfolios were assumed by Michael Wood, Kiri Allan, and Willie Jackson, respectively.  On 16 June, Faafoi was granted retention of the title "The Honourable" for life, in recognition of his term as a member of the Executive Council. Faafoi's resignation from Parliament took effect on 23 July.

After politics
After leaving Parliament, Faafoi started a lobbying and public relations firm called Dialogue22, serving as chief executive.

Personal life
Kris lives in Porirua with his partner Mae and three sons. Faafoi was married to Gina Faafoi-Rogers. Their son George was born 2008.

His elder brother Jason is a TV presenter and musician. They made a documentary together about their family visiting Tokelau, which was released in 2004.

Notes

References

|-

|-

|-

|-

|-

|-

1976 births
New Zealand people of Tokelauan descent
New Zealand Labour Party MPs
Government ministers of New Zealand
Members of the New Zealand House of Representatives
New Zealand MPs for North Island electorates
New Zealand journalists
Living people
21st-century New Zealand politicians
Candidates in the 2017 New Zealand general election
Candidates in the 2020 New Zealand general election
New Zealand Youth MPs
Justice ministers of New Zealand